Prageeth Rambukwella (born 22 January 1976) is a Sri Lankan former cricketer, who played in seven first-class and nine List A matches between 1995 and 2002. He is now an umpire, and stood in a tour match between Sri Lanka and Pakistan in June 2015. He is a member of the International Panel of ICC Umpires.

He stood in his first Twenty20 International (T20I) on 1 September 2019, between Sri Lanka and New Zealand. On 21 January 2022, he stood in his first One Day International (ODI) match, between Sri Lanka and Zimbabwe.

See also
 List of One Day International cricket umpires
 List of Twenty20 International cricket umpires

References

External links
 

1976 births
Living people
Sri Lankan cricketers
Sri Lankan cricket umpires
Sri Lankan One Day International cricket umpires
Sri Lankan Twenty20 International cricket umpires
Sportspeople from Moratuwa